Octagoncito (born April 24, 1974) is a Mexican Luchador enmascarado, or masked professional wrestler, who works in the Mini-Estrellas ("Mini-Stars") division on the Mexican Independent circuit. He is the first wrestler to work as Octagoncito, with Asistencia Asesoría y Administración (AAA) giving the same ring character to a second Octagoncito when the original one left the promotion in 1995. Octagoncito's real name is not a matter of public record, as is often the case with masked wrestlers in Mexico where their private lives are kept a secret from the wrestling fans. In addition to working for AAA Octagoncito has also worked for Consejo Mundial de Lucha Libre (CMLL), Lucha Libre USA, World Wrestling Federation (WWE), World Championship Wrestling (WCW) New Japan Pro-Wrestling (NJPW) and a slew of smaller wrestling promotions. Working in the Mini division does not necessarily mean that Octagoncito has dwarfism, as short wrestlers can also work in the "Mini" division.

Professional wrestling career
In 1989 Consejo Mundial de Lucha Libre (CMLL) created the wrestling character Octagón, a masked Mexican Ninja character that immediately became very popular with the audience, especially children. When CMLL started up their Mini-Estrellas division they created a number of Mascota characters, smaller versions of their well known wrestlers, one such Mascota was Octagoncito, created to play off the popularity of the regular sized competitor. Early in his career Octagoncito competed in the tournament to crown the first ever CMLL World Mini-Estrella Champion, losing in the second round to Espectrito. When Mini-Estrella creator Antonio Peña left CMLL in mid-1992 to for a new promotion called Asistencia Asesoría y Administración (AAA), Octagoncito and a number of other wrestlers and Mini-Estrellas left with Peña for AAA. On March 26, 1994 Octagoncito defeated Jerrito Estrada to win the Mexican National Mini-Estrella Championship. A few weeks later, on April 26, he competed in his first major AAA event, competing at Triplemanía II-A, AAA's biggest show of the year. Mascarita Sagrada, Octagoncito and Super Muñequito defeated Espectrito, Jerrito Estrada and Fuercito Guerrera by disqualification. His run with the Mexican National Mini-Estrellas Championship lasted 112 days, until July 16, 1994 where Fuercita Guerrera won the championship. At some point in the next year or two Octagoncito also won the IWC Mini-Estrellas Championship, although records are not clear on exactly when. On May 31, 1995 he wins his highest profile Luchas de Apuestas, or bet match, where he put his mask on the line against the hair of his opponent Especrito. Octagoncito won the match and kept his mask safe while Espectrito was shaved bald after the match. Octagoncito and his fellow Mini-Estrellas competed in the main event of Triplemanía III-A, a 13-man Steel Cage Elimination match where the last person in the cage would be forced to unmask under Lucha de Apuesta rules. The match included Octagoncito, Bandita, Espectrito I, Espectrito II, Jerrito Estrada, Fuercita Guerrera, Mascarita Sagrada, Mini Calo, La Parkita, Payasito Azul, Payasito Rojo, Super Muñequito and Torrerito. In the end Payasito Rojo was forced to unmask.

By 1995 Octagoncito and AAA management had a falling out and Octagoncito left the promotion, but took the name, the mask and the image of Octagoncito with him. He briefly worked for World Championship Wrestling (WCW) in the United States, including a match at the 1996 Starrcade where he teamed with Mascarita Sagrada to defeat Jerrito Estrada and Piratita Morgan in a dark match before the Pay-Per-View portion of the show. in 1997 he began working for the World Wrestling Federation (WWF), working as "Mosaic", teaming with and facing off against Mini-Estrellas from AAA. His first major appearance as Mosaic at the WWF PPV Badd Blood: In Your House, teaming with Tarantula, losing to Max Mini and Nova. At the 1998 Royal Rumble Mosaic teamed with former opponents Max Mini and Nova to defeat the trio of Battalion, El Torrito and Tarantula. He later returned to Mexico wrestling as Octagoncito, causing some confusion as AAA had introduced a different wrestler as Octagoncito as well. Over the years Octagoncito worked for International Wrestling Revolution Group (IWRG), CMLL and number of special appearances for various independent wrestling promotions. The WWF, now called World Wrestling Entertainment (WWE) reviewed their Minis division in 2006, bringing in Octagoncito as one of their competitors in the short lived revival. On August 2, 2009 Octagoncito defeated Piratita Morgan to win the WWA World Mini-Estrellas Championship, a title he wouldhold for 1040 days straight, losing it to Mascarita Platita in 2011. On September 20, 2009 he defeated Espectrito to win the reactivated NWA World Minis Championship on a Pro Wrestling Revolution show. Later on PWR withdrew from the National Wrestling Alliance, remaining the championship the PWR World Minis Championship. In 2011 and 2012 he worked for Lucha Libre USA, appearing on both seasons of their MTV2 show, often wrestling in mixed matches against both Mini-Estrellas and women at a time against regular sized competitors as well.

Championships and accomplishments
Asistencia Asesoría y Administración
IWC World Mini-Estrella Championship (1 time)
Mexican National Mini-Estrella Championship (1 time)
National Wrestling Alliance
NWA World Minis Championship (1 time)
Pro Wrestling Revolution
PWR World Minis Championship (1 time)
World Wrestling Association
WWA World Minis Championship (2 times)

Lucha de Apuesta record

References

1974 births
Living people
Mexican male professional wrestlers
Masked wrestlers
Midget professional wrestlers
Mini-Estrella wrestlers
Unidentified wrestlers
20th-century professional wrestlers
21st-century professional wrestlers
Mexican National Mini-Estrella Champions